Lofoten Stockfish Museum (Lofoten Tørrfiskmuseum)  is located in the village of Å in the municipality of Moskenes, in the Lofoten islands in the county of Nordland, Norway.  

The Lofoten Stockfish Museum  is devoted to the production of Norwegian stockfish, one of Norway's oldest export commodity.  The Museum is located in an old fish landing station. The museum displays  the  process from when the fish is brought ashore until it is finally packaged and ready for export. 
There are two museums located at Å in Lofoten, the other being the Norwegian Fishing Village Museum (Norsk Fiskeværsmuseum).

References

External links 
 Lofoten Stockfish Museum
  Norwegian Fishing Village Museum

Fish processing
Museums in Nordland
Industry museums in Norway
Moskenes
Maritime museums in Norway
Fishing museums
Fishing in Norway